Booti Booti National Park is a national park in New South Wales, Australia, by road, north-north-east of Sydney. The holiday town of Forster-Tuncurry lies immediately to the north.

History
The first European to inhabit the area was a Captain J. Gogerly who sailed from Forster to Sydney with loads of timber. He and some of his family are buried in the park. Mining for mineral sands took place at Seven Mile Beach from 1969 to 1975, and at Elizabeth Beach from 1969 to 1970. The park was declared a state recreation area from 30 September 1977, then a national park in 1992.

Geography
The three areas are connected by low–lying estuarine and aeolian sands. It separates Wallis Lake from the ocean. Cape Hawke and Charlotte Head were once islands, which became joined to the mainland by built-up sand deposits.

Flora
654 species of native plants have been recorded from Booti Booti National Park. This formed 46 distinct plant communities within the park boundaries. 17% of the park is classified as rainforest. Seven distinct wet sclerophyll forest and ten dry sclerophyll forest communities have been recorded.

Five species recognised as threatened by the New South Wales Government occur within the park – these are Allocasuarina defungens, A. simulans, Chamaesyce psammogeton, Cynanchum elegans and Senna acclinis.

104 exotic species have been recorded from the park. Bitou bush (Chrysanthemoides monilifera var. rotundata) has infested sand dunes and cliff areas, having spread from nearby beach habitat. Lantana camara infests the rainforest at Cape Hawke, particularly disturbed habitat. Madeira vine (Anredera cordifolia) and coast morning glory (Ipomoea cairica) are vines that grow over and smother native vegetation in the park.

Fauna
Booti Booti National Park has had 210 species of bird recorded within its limits.

Activities
Activities at Booti Booti National Park include hiking, swimming, birdwatching, mooning and, during winter, whale watching. Camping sites are located at The Ruins, in the  Booti Hill area at the park's southern end. A lookout is located on top of Cape Hawke.

See also 
 List of reduplicated Australian place names
 Protected areas of New South Wales

References

National parks of the Hunter Region
Protected areas established in 1992
Mid-Coast Council
1992 establishments in Australia